Miguel Ângelo Magno Castro (born 2 February 1994) is a Portuguese futsal player who plays as a winger for the Portugal national team.

Honours
Benfica
Campeonato Nacional: 2018–19
Taça da Liga: 2019–20

International
Portugal
FIFA Futsal World Cup: 2021
UEFA Futsal Championship: 2022

External links

1994 births
Living people
Sportspeople from Porto
Futsal forwards
Portuguese men's futsal players
Sporting CP futsal players
S.L. Benfica futsal players